Cleft palate short stature vertebral anomalies, also known as Mathieu-De Broca-Bony syndrome, is a very rare multi-systemic genetic disorder which is characterized by congenital cleft palate, facial dysmorphisms, short stature and neck, vertebral abnormalities and intellectual disabilities. It is thought to be inherited in an autosomal dominant fashion.



Presentation 

People with this disorder usually show the following symptoms:
 Cleft palate
 Facial asymmetry
 Epicanthal folds
 Short nose
 Anteverted nostrils
 Low-set ears
 Reduced thickness of upper lip
 Micrognathism
 Short stature
 Short neck
 Vertebral abnormalities
 Intellectual disabilities
 Single transversal palmar line

Etiology 
This disorder was first discovered in 1993 by M Mathieu et al., when they described an adult man and his (also affected) son with the symptoms mentioned above, since then, no other cases of the disorder have been described in medical literature.

References 

Rare genetic syndromes
Syndromes with cleft lip and/or palate
Syndromes with short stature
Syndromes with intellectual disability